The  Miss Kentucky USA competition is the pageant that selects the representative for the state of Kentucky in the Miss USA pageant. It is currently directed by Proctor Productions and it was formerly directed by Connie Clark Harrison, Miss Kentucky USA 1976.

Tara Conner became the first Kentucky delegate to win Miss USA, after being crowned Miss USA 2006. She later finished as fourth runner-up at Miss Universe 2006. Elle Smith later became the second Kentucky delegate to win Miss USA, being crowned Miss USA 2021. 

Three Miss Kentucky USA titleholders have also held the Miss Kentucky Teen USA title and competed at Miss Teen USA, including Conner. Two Miss Kentucky USA titleholders have also competed at Miss America, with one representing Wyoming.

Lizzy Neutz of Louisville was crowned Miss Kentucky USA 2022 on March 26, 2022, at The Center for Rural Development in Somerset. She represented Kentucky for the title of Miss USA 2022.

Media coverage
In 2006, it was reported that Miss Kentucky USA 2002, Elizabeth Arnold was in a relationship with celebrity Nick Lachey.  That same year Tara Conner became the first Kentucky delegate to win the Miss USA title, putting Kentucky in the top five for the second consecutive year, after Kristen Johnson placed 2nd runner-up in 2005.  She later came under intense scrutiny when it was revealed that she had been drinking underage, tested positive for the use of cocaine, and kissed Miss Teen USA Katie Blair, among other things.  Conner was allowed to keep her title, but was ordered into rehab for one month.  After her rehab session, she resumed her reign until her year was completed.

In 2008, Miss Kentucky USA Alysha Harris was involved in an incident involving photos in which she was photographed dancing with New England Patriots wide receiver Randy Moss in a manner some saw as sexually suggestive.

Results summary

Placements
Miss USA: Tara Conner (2006), Elle Smith (2021)
2nd runners-up: Kristen Johnson (2005)
3rd runners-up: Julie Andrus (1965)
4th runners-up: Johanna Reid (1964), Patricia Barnstable (1971), Lisa Devillez (1980), Kristina Leah Chapman (1982), Maria Montgomery (2009)
Top 6: Tiffany Tenfelde (1990), Angela Hines (1992)
Top 11/12: Carol Wallace (1975), Mitzi Jones (1995), Katie George (2015)
Top 15/20: Mary Ann Stice (1953), Marcia Chumbler (1961)

Kentucky holds a record of 16 placements at Miss USA.

Awards
Miss Congeniality: June Pinkley (1968), Connie Clark (1976), Kia Hampton (2011)
Miss Photogenic: Robyn Overby (1985)
Best State Costume: Charlesy Gulick (1974)

Winners 

Color key

1 Age at the time of the Miss Kentucky USA pageant

References

External links
Miss Kentucky USA official website

Beauty pageants in Kentucky
Kentucky
Women in Kentucky
Organizations based in Louisville, Kentucky
Recurring events established in 1952
1952 establishments in Kentucky
Annual events in Kentucky